The Little Joe River is a  watercourse in northwestern Minnesota. It is a tributary of the north branch of the Two Rivers, which drains into the Red River of the North.

See also
List of rivers of Minnesota

References

Minnesota Watersheds
USGS Hydrologic Unit Map - State of Minnesota (1974)

Rivers of Minnesota
Tributaries of Hudson Bay
Rivers of Kittson County, Minnesota